Chang Jung Christian University (CJCU) is a privately funded, research-intensive, Presbyterian, co-educational university located in Gueiren District, Tainan, Taiwan. Chang Jung means everlasting glory in Mandarin.

History
The university was founded in 1993. Edward Band, who taught at the school from the 1910s to 1940, was credited with introducing association football to Taiwan.

Academic profile 
Chang Jung Christian University (CJCU) is a private university located in southern Taiwan. In association with the Presbyterian beliefs, CJCU is committed in developing the God-given gifts and abilities of each student with love, respect, and service. Even though the university was founded in 1993, our vision began more than a hundred years ago, in 1885, with the founding of the first Western-methodology high school in Taiwan, Chang Jung Senior High School.

There are currently 54 bachelors programs, 17 masters programs, and 1 doctoral program.

Organization
A president heads the university, which is divided into the following colleges:

College of Management
College of Health Science
College of Humanities and Social Sciences
School of Information and Design
School of Theology
College of Continuing Education
International College of Practice and Education for the Environment
School of Safety and Health Sciences
College of Fine Arts
School of Liberal Arts Education

Transportation
The university is accessible within walking distance South of Chang Jung Christian University Station of the Taiwan Railway Administration.

See also
 List of universities in Taiwan

References

External links

Chang Jung Christian University
Location in Tainan
Campus map

1993 establishments in Taiwan
Association of Christian Universities and Colleges in Asia
Presbyterianism in Taiwan
Educational institutions established in 1993
Presbyterian universities and colleges
Universities and colleges in Taiwan
Universities and colleges in Tainan
Comprehensive universities in Taiwan